Cameosis is the fifth album by the funk band Cameo, released in 1980.

Reception
Cameosis reached number one on the R&B album charts and number twenty five on the Billboard 200 album charts. It was certified gold for sales of more than 500,000 copies in the US. The two singles, "We're Goin' Out Tonight" and "Shake Your Pants", charted on the R&B singles charts at number 11 and 8 respectively. However, "Shake Your Pants" received considerable radio play as an album track, and was already a bonafide hit prior to being released as a single. The album's closing track, "Why Have I Lost You", was a new version of the same song that had been released on the band's second album. This re-recorded rendition also received considerable airplay, and has remained a staple of the late night "quiet storm" format at urban adult contemporary radio.

Track listing
Cameosis – (Larry Blackmon, Aaron Mills) 4:09 
Shake Your Pants – (Larry Blackmon) 6:21  
Please You – (Larry Blackmon, Gregory Johnson) 4:15 
We're Goin' Out Tonight – (Larry Blackmon, Nathan Leftenant, Tomi Jenkins) 4:40 
I Care for You – (Larry Blackmon, Anthony Lockett) 4:34 
On the One – (Larry Blackmon, Anthony Lockett, Tomi Jenkins) 4:59 
Why Have I Lost You – (Larry Blackmon) 4:34

Personnel

Cameo
Larry Blackmon - lead vocals, drums, percussion
 Gregory Johnson - keyboards, Fender Rhodes, vocals
Aaron Mills - bass guitar, vocals
Thomas 'T.C.' Campbell - piano, Fender Rhodes, Moog synthesizer
Anthony Lockett - guitar, vocals
Arnett Leftenant - saxophone, vocals
Nathan Leftenant - trumpet, vocals
Jeryl Bright - trombone
Tomi Jenkins, Wayne Cooper - vocals

Others
Arthur Young - trumpet
Angel Allende - congas

Charts

Weekly charts

Year-end charts

Singles

References

External links
 Cameosis at Discogs

1980 albums
Cameo (band) albums